= How to Launch Your Own Board Game =

Book by Longbridge Enterprises

How to Launch Your Own Board Game is a book published in 1989 by Longbridge Enterprises.

== Contents ==
How to Launch Your Own Board Game is a book in which a do-it-yourself approach is presented for board game publication.

== Reception ==
Brian Walker reviewed How to Launch Your Own Board Game for Games International magazine, and gave it a rating of 1 out of 10 (a turkey), and stated that the given price "for 13 pages does not seem much of a bargain by any standards, especially when you consider the information provided is unlikely to result in even such a modest investment being recouped. Even if there is need for a book on this subject, this is not it."
